This is a list of Albanian European Film Award winners and nominees. This list details the performances of Albanian actors, actresses, and films that have either been submitted or nominated for, or have won, a European Film Award.

Awards and nominations

Nominations – 3
Wins – 1

See also
 List of Albanian submissions for the Academy Award for Best Foreign Language Film

References

External links
 Nominees and winners at the European Film Academy website

Albania
European Film Awards